Hugh Mendes (born 11 November 1955) is a contemporary British painter.

He was born in the British Military Hospital in Hostert, Germany. Mendes was graduated from Chelsea School of Art with a BA in painting in 1978, and from City and Guilds of London Art School with an MA in painting in 2001.

Mendes paints obituaries taken from newspapers and he has had a solo exhibition at Fishmarket Gallery, Northampton.  He was exhibited in "The Future Can Wait" in 2008. Mendes is represented by GUSFORD and had his first solo exhibition with them in March 2013.

References

Living people
1955 births
21st-century English painters
English male painters
Alumni of Chelsea College of Arts
21st-century English male artists